Two ships of the United States Navy have borne the name USS Rathburne, named in honor of the John Rathbun, one of the first officers of the Continental Navy. "Rathburne" is an incorrect spelling of the name Rathbun, which has also been spelled Rathbourne, Rathburn, or Rathbon.

Originally classified as a destroyer escort, DE-1057, she was reclassified as a frigate in 1975.

United States Navy ship names